Break a Dawn is a studio album by Zion I. It was released by Live Up Records and Handcuts Records in 2006.

Imran Khan of PopMatters wrote, "Break a Dawn traded on the strut of '70s funk, adding some summery spring to the cool, turntablist swings."

Track listing

Personnel
Credits adapted from liner notes.

 Zion (Zion I) – vocals
 Amp Live (Zion I) – production
 Ms. Marianna – vocals (2)
 Mike Tiger – guitar (2, 6), bass guitar (6)
 Headnodic – bass guitar (2, 4), guitar (4), piano (9)
 Deuce Eclipse – vocals (3)
 D.U.S.T. – vocals (3)
 Raashan Ahmad – vocals (4)
 David Boyce – saxophone (5)
 Danny AA – vocals (6)
 Peter De Lion – bass guitar (9)
 Lyrics Born – vocals (13)
 Gift of Gab – vocals (13)
 C. Holiday – vocals (13)
 Cava Menzies – vocals (14), piano (14)
 DJ Worldwise – turntables
 Jason Moss – mixing, mastering
 Kevin Hsieh – cover artwork
 Flavor Innovator – additional artwork, layout, design
 Juliette Ordonia – photography

References

External links
 

2006 albums
Zion I albums